is a Japanese actor. He is well known for his role as Gorisan (Detective Ishizuka) in Taiyō ni Hoero!. He has a son , who is a musician and guitarist.

Once, he belonged to Toshiro Mifune's production company.

Selected filmography

Films
Moero! Seishun (1968) - Raita Ejima
The Bullet Train (1975) - Kikuchi
Stage-Struck Tora-san (1978) - Detective Hashikawa
G.I. Samurai (1979) - Haruhisa Kimura
Station (1981)
Sukkari... sono ki de! (1981) - Detective
Kizudarake no Kunshō (1986) - Toshima
Tokyo Blackout (1987) - Horie
Kanbakku (1990)
Isan Sōzoku (1990) - Motoharu Fujishima
Rainbow Kids (1991) - Sakuma
Tsuribaka Nisshi (1994-1998) - Chief of Personnel Haraguchi
Oishinbo (1996)
Hana no oedo no Tsuribaka Nisshi (1998)
Keizoku: The Movie (2000) - Kōtarō Nonomura
Happily Ever After (2007)
20th Century Boys 1: Beginning of the End (2008) - Chō-san
First Love: A Memory in Summer (2009)
Hanjiro (2010)
Homecoming (2011) - Tadashi Ohshima
SPEC: Ten (2012) - Kotaro Nonomura
SPEC: Close (2013) - Nonomura Kotaro
A Banana? At This Time of Night? (2018) - Kiyoshi Kano
We Make Antiques! Kyoto Rendezvous (2019) - Manzo Okuno
Hope (2020)
Food Luck (2020)
What Happened to Our Nest Egg!? (2021)

Television
Taiyō ni Hoero! (1972-1982) - Ishizuka "Gori-san" Makoto
Tokugawa Ieyasu (1983) - Tenkai
Sanada Taiheiki (1985-1986) - Katō Kiyomasa
Dokuganryū Masamune (1987) - Date Sanemoto
Abare Hasshū Goyō Tabi (1991-1994)
Hoshi no Kinka (1996) - Seiichirō Nagai
Unsolved Cases (1999) - Kōtarō Nonomura
Aoi (2000) - Gamō Satoie
Kokoro (2003) - Ikkoku Nakajima
The Man Who Can't Get Married (2006)
Fūrin Kazan (2007) - Amari Torayasu 
Teppan (2010-2011) - Den Hasegawa
Gunshi Kanbei (2015) - Kuroda Shigetaka
Segodon (2018) - Zusho Hirosato
Ōoku: The Inner Chambers (2023) - Keishō-in

References

External links
 Official profile 
 

Japanese male actors
1940 births
Living people
People from Minoh, Osaka